The Little Pecan Island Site (16 CM 43) is an archaeological site of the Coastal Coles Creek culture, occupied by Native Americans from 800 to 1100 CE near Grand Chenier, Louisiana in Cameron Parish. Investigations by Robert Wauchope in 1946 produced a number of flexed burials and ceramic chronologies which helped determine the age and cultural affiliation of the site.

See also
 Morgan Mounds
Culture, phase, and chronological table for the Mississippi Valley

References

Acadiana
Archaeological sites of the Coles Creek culture
Geography of Cameron Parish, Louisiana
Archaeological sites in Louisiana